Huron County is a county located in the U.S. state of Ohio. As of the 2020 census, the population was 58,565. Its county seat is Norwalk. The county was created in 1809 and later organized in 1815.

Huron County is included in the Norwalk, OH Micropolitan Statistical Area, which is also included in the Cleveland-Akron-Canton, OH Combined Statistical Area.

History
Huron County was named in honor of the Huron Indians (more correctly called the Wyandot), an Iroquoian-speaking tribe who occupied large areas in the Great Lakes region. The word "Huron" may be French, although this origin is disputed.

In the late 18th century this area was in the US Northwest Territory, part of the Connecticut Western Reserve in a sub-region called the Firelands. Connecticut had originally claimed the land as part of its original colony, then afterward wanted to use it to grant land to veterans in lieu of cash payment for their service in the war. In 1795 the Connecticut Land Company purchased this land for resale and development. Later it was solely administered by the "Fire Land Company".

At its formation, Huron County consisted of all the Firelands. However, as the population increased in the region, the sections in the northern areas of the county were divided and assigned to the newly organized Erie and Ottawa counties, and a township in the southern section became part of the newly established Ashland County.

Geography

Adjacent counties
 Erie County (north)
 Lorain County (east)
 Ashland County (southeast)
 Richland County (south)
 Crawford County (southwest)
 Seneca County (west)
 Sandusky County (northwest)

Demographics

2000 census
As of the census of 2000, there were 59,487 people, 22,307 households, and 16,217 families living in the county. The population density was 121 people per square mile (47/km2). There were 23,594 housing units at an average density of 48 per square mile (18/km2). The racial makeup of the county was 95.98% White, 0.97% Black or African American, 0.18% Native American, 0.25% Asian, 0.01% Pacific Islander, 1.63% from other races, and 0.99% from two or more races. 3.56% of the population were Hispanic or Latino of any race.

There were 22,307 households, out of which 36.30% had children under the age of 18 living with them, 58.50% were married couples living together, 10.40% had a female householder with no husband present, and 27.30% were non-families. 23.10% of all households were made up of individuals, and 9.70% had someone living alone who was 65 years of age or older. The average household size was 2.64 and the average family size was 3.11.

In the county, the population was spread out, with 28.30% under the age of 18, 8.50% from 18 to 24, 28.90% from 25 to 44, 21.90% from 45 to 64, and 12.40% who were 65 years of age or older. The median age was 35 years. For every 100 females there were 96.10 males. For every 100 females age 18 and over, there were 92.90 males.

The median income for a household in the county was $40,558, and the median income for a family was $46,911. Males had a median income of $35,760 versus $22,785 for females. The per capita income for the county was $18,133. About 6.50% of families and 8.50% of the population were below the poverty line, including 11.00% of those under age 18 and 7.70% of those age 65 or over.

2010 census
As of the 2010 United States Census, there were 59,626 people, 22,820 households, and 16,141 families living in the county. The racial makeup of the county was 94.9% white, 1.0% black or African American, 0.3% Asian, 0.2% American Indian, 2.0% from other races, and 1.6% from two or more races. Those of Hispanic or Latino origin made up 5.6% of the population. In terms of ancestry, 36.4% were German, 14.5% were Irish, 10.8% were English, and 8.9% were American.

Of the 22,820 households, 35.0% had children under the age of 18 living with them, 53.5% were married couples living together, 12.2% had a female householder with no husband present, 29.3% were non-families, and 24.4% of all households were made up of individuals. The average household size was 2.59 and the average family size was 3.05. The median age was 38.4 years.

The median income for a household in the county was $47,058 and the median income for a family was $53,887. Males had a median income of $41,566 versus $30,967 for females. The per capita income for the county was $21,743. About 10.9% of families and 14.5% of the population were below the poverty line, including 23.3% of those under age 18 and 7.0% of those age 65 or over.

Politics
Huron County has almost always been a Republican stronghold.  However, in the election of 1996, Bill Clinton narrowly carried the county by a margin of .6%.

|}

Government

Officials
Commissioner - Terry Boose

Commissioner - Harry Brady

Commissioner -  Bruce "Skip" Wilde 

Auditor - Roland Tkach

Clerk of Courts - Susan Hazel

Coroner - Jeffery Harwood

Engineer - Joseph B. Kovach

Prosecutor - Joel Sitterly 

Recorder - Jan Tkach 

Treasurer - Kathleen Schaffer

Sheriff - Todd Corbin 

Judge of Court of Common Pleas - James Conway

Court Secretary (non-elected position) - Julie Wise

Education

Infrastructure

Major highways

  US Route 20
  US Route 224
  US Route 250
  State Route 4
  State Route 13
  State Route 18
  State Route 60
  State Route 61
  State Route 99
  State Route 103
  State Route 113
  State Route 162
  State Route 269
  State Route 303
  State Route 547
  State Route 598
  State Route 601
  State Route 603

Communities

Cities
 Bellevue
 Norwalk (county seat)
 Willard

Villages

 Greenwich
 Milan
 Monroeville
 New London
 North Fairfield
 Plymouth
 Wakeman

Townships

 Bronson
 Clarksfield
 Fairfield
 Fitchville
 Greenfield
 Greenwich
 Hartland
 Lyme
 New Haven
 New London
 Norwalk
 Norwich
 Peru
 Richmond
 Ridgefield
 Ripley
 Sherman
 Townsend
 Wakeman

https://web.archive.org/web/20160715023447/http://www.ohiotownships.org/township-websites

Census-designated places
 Celeryville
 Collins
 Holiday Lakes
 New Haven

Unincorporated communities
 Boughtonville
 Centerton
 Clarksfield
 Delphi
 East Townsend
 Fitchville
 Havana
 Hunts Corners
 New Pittsburgh
 North Monroeville
 Olena
 Steuben

Notable people
 Ezekiel S. Sampson, two-term Republican Congressman from Iowa's 6th congressional district; born in Huron County.
 Paul Brown, American college and professional football coach; member of the Pro Football Hall of Fame
 Lefty Grove, American baseball player, member of the Baseball Hall of Fame

See also
 National Register of Historic Places listings in Huron County, Ohio

References

Further reading
 William W. Williams, History of the Fire Lands, Comprising Huron and Erie Counties, Ohio: With Illustrations and Biographical Sketches of Some of the Prominent Men and Pioneers. Cleveland, OH: Press of Leader Printing Company, 1879.

External links
 
 Huron County Commissioners
 Huron County Development Council
 Huron County Clerk

 
1815 establishments in Ohio
Populated places established in 1815
Ohio counties in the Western Reserve